The Japan men's national under-19 volleyball team represents Japan in men's under-19 volleyball events, it is controlled and managed by the Japanese Volleyball Association that is a member of Asian volleyball body Asian Volleyball Confederation (AVC) and the international volleyball body government the Fédération Internationale de Volleyball (FIVB).

Results

Summer Youth Olympics
 Champions   Runners up   Third place   Fourth place

FIVB U19 World Championship
 Champions   Runners up   Third place   Fourth place

Asian Boys' U18 Volleyball Championship
 Champions   Runners up   Third place   Fourth place

Team

Current squad

The following is the roster in the 2019 FIVB Volleyball Boys' U19 World Championship.
Head coach:  Hiroshi Honda

Notable players
Yuki Ishikawa (2012–2013)
Kentaro Takahashi (2012–2013)
Taishi Onodera (2012–2013)
Masaki Oya (2012–2013)
Issei Otake (2013)
Kenta Takanashi (2015)
Yuji Nishida (2017)
Tatsunori Otsuka (2017)
Kento Miyaura (2017–2018)

See also
Japan men's national under-19 volleyball team
Japan women's national under-20 volleyball team
Japan men's national under-21 volleyball team
Japan men's national volleyball team

References

External links
Official website

National men's under-19 volleyball teams
Volleyball in Japan
Volleyball